Statistics of Croatian First League in the 1946 season.

City of Zagreb preliminaries "A"

City of Zagreb preliminaries "B"

City of Zagreb championship

Zagreb Provincial championship
Borac Zagreb 0-1 ; 1-8 FD Dubrava Zagreb

City of Osijek championship
1 : FD Jedinstvo Osijek
2 : FD Udarnik Osijek
3 : FD Tipograf Osijek
4 : FD Sloga Osijek
5 : FD Bratstvo Osijek

Region of Banija championship
SFD Sloboda Sisak 8-1 ; 3-0 OFD Turkulin Petrinja

District of Karlovac championship
Udarnik Karlovac qualified to play-offs

District of Primorsko-goranska championship
FD Jedinstvo Susak qualified to play-offs

Also played FD Crikvenica, Omladinac Senj, Plavi Jadran Pag, NK Naprijed Hreljin

Region of Slavonia championship

Semifinals
Sloga Vinkovci 5-1 ; 1-5 ; 0-3 FD Proleter Belisce
SFD Naprijed Sisak 2-0 ; 1-0 FD Jedinstvo Osijek

Final
SFD Naprijed Sisak 2-0 ; 0-3 FD Proleter Belisce

District of Varazdin championship

District of Bjelovar championship
Bjelovar qualified to play-offs

Region of Dalmatia championship

Preliminary round
Zadar 1-0 ; 1-2 Sibenik

Final
RSD Split 0-2 ; 1-6 FD Hajduk Split

Play-offs
RSD Split 4-0 Dubrovnik
Sibenik 1-2; 0-4 RSD Split

Play-offs

Round 1
Bjelovar 1-5 ; 1-2 RSD Tekstilac Varazdin
Udarnik Karlovac 4-2 ; 1-3 FD Dubrava Zagreb
SFD Naprijed Sisak 2-1 ; 4-1 FD Amater Zagreb
FD Metalac Zagreb 8-0 ; 3-1 FD Jedinstvo Susak

Round 2
FD Dubrava Zagreb 3-2 ; 1-3 RSD Tekstilac Varazdin
FD Jedinstvo Susak 6-0 ; 2-4 SFD Naprijed Sisak

Additional play-off
Lokomotiva Zagreb 1-0 ; 3-0 FD Dubrava Zagreb

Final Stage

City of Rijeka championship

Rijeka/Istria Final
SD Kvarner Rijeka 1-2 ; 4-1 US Operaia Pula

References
rsssf

Croatian First league seasons
Croatia
Croatia
Croatia
Croatia
Football